The NFL Top 100 Players of 2017 was the seventh season in the series. It ended with reigning Super Bowl MVP Tom Brady being ranked #1. This made Brady the first player to be voted #1 more than once. It was also just the second time the #1 ranked player was not the reigning NFL MVP of the league, as Matt Ryan came in at #10.

Of the 32 NFL teams, only 3 did not have players that made the list; The Chicago Bears, New York Jets, and San Francisco 49ers.

Episode list

The list

References

National Football League trophies and awards
National Football League records and achievements
National Football League lists